In the agricultural context, diversification can be regarded as the re-allocation of some of a farm's productive resources, such as land, capital, farm equipment and labour to other products and, particularly in richer countries, to non-farming activities such as restaurants and shops. Factors leading to decisions to diversify are many, but include: reducing risk, responding to changing consumer demands or changing government policy, responding to external shocks and, more recently, as a consequence of climate change.

Definitions of diversification
Agricultural diversification can involve movement of resources from low-value commodities to high-value ones. It focuses mainly on horticultural, dairy, poultry and fisheries sectors. While most definitions of diversification in developing countries do work on the assumption that diversification primarily involves a substitution of one crop or other agricultural product for another, or an increase in the number of enterprises, or activities, carried out by a particular farm, the definition used in developed countries sometimes relates more to the development of activities on the farm that do not involve agricultural production. For example, one section of the British Department for Environment, Food and Rural Affairs (DEFRA) defines diversification as “the entrepreneurial use of farm resources for a non-agricultural purpose for commercial gain”. Using this definition DEFRA found that 56% of UK farms had diversified in 2003. The great majority of diversification activities simply involved the renting out of farm buildings for non-farming use, but 9% of farms had become involved with processing or retailing, 3% with provision of tourist accommodation or catering, and 7% with sport or recreational activities. Others adopt a broader definition, which may include development of new marketing opportunities.

In developing countries such as India, which has been one of the leaders in promoting diversification, the concept is applied both to individual farmers and to different regions, with government programmes being aimed at promoting widespread diversification. The concept in India is seen as referring to the “shift from the regional dominance of one crop to regional production of a number of crops ...... (which takes into account)..... the economic returns from different value-added crops... with complementary marketing opportunities”.

Drivers of diversification
Diversification can be a response to both opportunities and threats.

Opportunities
 Changing consumer demand. As consumers in developing countries have become richer, food consumption patterns have changed noticeably. People have moved away from a diet based on staples to one with a greater content of animal products (meat, eggs, and dairy) and fruits and vegetables. In turn, more dynamic farmers are able to diversify to meet these needs. There is a possibility that this trend will be reversed in future given increasing consumer concern about the environmental impact of meat production.
 Changing demographics. Rapid urbanization in developing countries affects consumption patterns. Moreover, a smaller number of farmers, in percentage terms at least, has to supply a larger number of consumers. While this may not imply diversification it does require adaptation to new farming techniques to meet higher demand.
 Export potential. Developing country farmers have had considerable success by diversifying into crops that can meet export market demand. While concern about food miles, as well as the cost of complying with supermarket certification requirements such as for GlobalGAP may jeopardize this success in the long run, there remains much potential to diversify to meet export markets.
 Adding value. The pattern witnessed in the West, and now becoming widespread in developing countries, is for consumers to devote less and less time to food preparation. They increasingly require ready-prepared meals and labour-saving packaging, such as pre-cut salads. This provides the opportunity for farmers to diversify into value addition, particularly in countries where supermarkets play a major role in retailing.
 Changing marketing opportunities. The changing of government policies that control the way in which farmers can link to markets can open up new diversification possibilities. For example, in India, policy changes to remove the monopoly of state “regulated markets” to handle all transactions made it possible for farmers to establish direct contracts with buyers for new products.
 Improving nutrition. Diversifying from the monoculture of traditional staples can have important nutritional benefits for farmers in developing countries.

Threats
 Urbanization. This is both an opportunity and a threat, in that the expansion of cities places pressure on land resources and puts up the value of the land. If farmers are to remain on the land they need to generate greater income from that land than they could by growing basic staples. This fact, and the proximity of markets, explains why farmers close to urban areas tend to diversify into high-value crops.
 Risk. Farmers face risk from bad weather and from fluctuating prices. Diversification is a logical response to both. For example, some crops are more drought-resistant than others, but may offer poorer economic returns. A diversified portfolio of products should ensure that farmers do not suffer complete ruin when the weather is bad. Similarly, diversification can manage price risk, on the assumption that not all products will suffer low prices at the same time. In fact, farmers often do the opposite of diversification by planting products that have a high price in one year, only to see the price collapse in the next, as explained by the cobweb theory.
 External threats. Farmers who are dependent on exports run the risk that conditions will change in their markets, not because of a change in consumer demand but because of policy changes. A classic example is the Caribbean banana industry, which collapsed as a result of the removal of quota protection on EU markets, necessitating diversification by the region's farmers.
 Domestic policy threats. Agricultural production is sometimes undertaken as a consequence of government subsidies, rather than because it is inherently profitable. The reduction or removal of those subsidies, whether direct or indirect, can have a major effect on farmers and provide a significant incentive for diversification or, in some cases, for returning to production of crops grown prior to the introduction of subsidies.
 Climate change. The type of crop that can be grown is affected by changes in temperatures and the length of the growing season. Climate change could also modify the availability of water for production. Farmers in several countries, including Canada, India, Kenya, Mozambique, and Sri Lanka have already initiated diversification as a response to climate change. Government policy in Kenya to promote crop diversification has included the removal of subsidies for some crops, encouraging land-use zoning and introducing differential land tax systems.

Opportunities for diversification

In making decisions about diversification farmers need to consider whether income generated by new farm enterprises will be greater than the existing activities, with similar or less risk. While growing new crops or raising animals may be technically possible, these may not be suitable for many farmers in terms of their land, labour and capital resources. Moreover, markets for the products may be lacking.  The United Nations Food and Agriculture Organization (FAO) has been one of the development organizations promoting diversification by small farmers and has produced booklets identifying beekeeping, mushroom farming, milk production, fish ponds and sheep and goats, among others, as diversification possibilities.

Measures of diversification

Agricultural diversification is measured in a number of ways throughout the world. For example, one such measure is the index of maximum proportion, which is "defined as the ratio (proportion) of the farm's primary activity to its total activities".

See also
 Agricultural value chain

References

External links
Agricultural Research Service - contributes to maintaining agricultural diversity through research
 FAO Diversification Booklets

Agriculture